Jens Jensen may refer to:
 Jens Jensen (footballer) (1890–1957), Danish football (soccer) player who played one game for the Denmark national football team
 Jens Jensen (landscape architect) (1860–1951), Danish-born landscape architect in Chicago, Illinois
 Jens Jensen (politician) (1865–1936), Australian politician
 Jens Jensen (trade unionist) (1859–1928), Danish trade unionist and Social Democratic politician
 Jens Kristian Jensen (1885–1956), Danish gymnast and Olympic medalist
 Jens S. Jensen (1946–2015), Swedish photographer and writer
 Jens Berendt Jensen (born 1940), Danish Olympic rower
 Jens Christian Jensen (1928–2013), German art historian and curator

See also 
 Jens Book-Jenssen (1910–1999), Norwegian singer, songwriter, revue artist and theatre director